The following is a list of former Major League Baseball (MLB) players who played in at least 10 MLB seasons and spent their entire MLB playing careers exclusively with one franchise. In most cases, this means the player only appeared with one team; there are also players whose team was relocated (e.g. the Athletics) or had a name change (e.g. the Angels) during their career. Some listed players subsequently went on to coach or manage with other teams, or may have had minor league or foreign league appearances with other franchises. Some listed players had their careers ended by accidents, such as Roberto Clemente, who died in a 1972 airplane crash, and Roy Campanella, who was paralyzed in a 1958 automobile accident.

, 187 players have completed the feat, of which the New York Yankees have had the most, with 25. The San Francisco Giants have had the most in the National League, with 15. Bid McPhee and Mike Tiernan, both of whom played exclusively in the 19th century, were the first two players to do so. Brooks Robinson and Carl Yastrzemski share the distinction of the longest tenure with a single team, 23 seasons with the Baltimore Orioles and Boston Red Sox, respectively. Mel Ott and Stan Musial share the distinction of the longest tenure with a single team in the National League, having played 22 seasons with the New York Giants and St. Louis Cardinals, respectively. Yadier Molina, who spent 19 seasons with the St. Louis Cardinals, is the most recent player to complete a career of at least 10 seasons with one team.

Players
Only players who are no longer active are listed here. This list does not include active players, or free agents who have not yet retired (such players are listed below). A player is considered "inactive" if he has not played baseball for one year or has announced his retirement.

Honorable mention
 Bug Holliday played 10 seasons for the Cincinnati Reds franchise, from 1889 to 1898, appearing in 930 games. During the 1885 World Series, one of several pre-modern World Series held from 1884 to 1890, Holliday had played in one game for the Chicago White Stockings of the National League (today's Chicago Cubs). This was Holliday's only major league appearance for a franchise other than Cincinnati. As MLB considers the first World Series to have been the 1903 edition, some baseball sites list Holliday as having only played for a single franchise.

Negro league baseball
 While Roy Campanella and Jackie Robinson each only played for a single team within Major League Baseball (hence their inclusion in the above list), each also played for other teams now considered major-league within Negro league baseball: Campanella with the Baltimore Elite Giants and Robinson with the Kansas City Monarchs.
 Within Negro league baseball, Buck Leonard and Bullet Rogan each had careers in excess of a decade with a single major-league team, the Homestead Grays and Kansas City Monarchs, respectively.

Late-career moves
Players who spend 20 or more seasons with a single franchise before ending their career playing for another team (thus disqualifying them from inclusion in the above list) include:
 Hank Aaron: 21 seasons with the Milwaukee / Atlanta Braves before finishing his career with the Milwaukee Brewers in 1975 and 1976
 Phil Cavarretta: 20 seasons with the Chicago Cubs, before ending his career with the Chicago White Sox in 1954 and 1955
 Ty Cobb: 22 seasons with the Detroit Tigers, before ending his career with the Philadelphia Athletics in 1927 and 1928
 Harmon Killebrew: 21 seasons with the Washington Senators / Minnesota Twins before being released by the Twins and finishing his career with the Kansas City Royals in 1975
 Willie Mays: 21 seasons with the New York / San Francisco Giants before being traded to the New York Mets in 1972 and ending his career there in 1973

Counts by franchise
Table last updated October 29, 2022.

Active players

The following active players have played at least 10 seasons with only a single MLB franchise, making them potential future additions to the main list above.

Players are removed from this list only when they retire or make a regular season appearance with a different MLB team.
 Denotes a player who is currently a free agent.
 Denotes a player who is under contract with a different team.

See also
 List of NBA players who have spent their entire career with one franchise
 List of NHL players who spent their entire career with one franchise
 List of National Football League players who spent their entire career with one franchise
 List of one-club men in association football
 List of one-club men in rugby league

Notes

References
Researched through the Baseball-Reference.com website.

Further reading

 (Note: ESPN's list is missing several players)

Major League Baseball lists
Baseball, major league